Aaron Michael Evans (born 21 November 1994) is an Australian professional footballer who plays as a centre-back or defensive midfielder for Indian Super League club NorthEast United. He also has Croatian citizenship.

A product of Capital Football Academy and ACT Academy of Sport, in 2011, he moved to his first senior club, playing with Canberra FC in the Capital Premier League as a 16-year-old. He signed his first professional contract with Hong Kong Premier League club Tai Po in September 2014 aged 19.

Career

Youth 

Capital Football Academy

From U11 to U15 was selected in the Capital Football Academy playing squads and participated in the Premier League competition. Whilst a member of the Academy squads Evans was selected to participate in the U14 and U15 Boys National Football Championships in Coffs Harbour.

ACT Academy of Sport (ACTAS)

Football scholarship with the ACT Academy of Sports for 2 years. During his scholarship, Evans toured Europe and Asia training and playing. Countries toured include England, Germany, Holland and China.

Australian Schoolboys

In January 2013 selected in the Australian U19 Schoolboys Squad to participate in a 3-week tour of Brazil and Argentina. Played games against Boca Juniors, Botafogo, Estudiantes. Evans was awarded the Man of the Match in the game vs Rosario. Also participated in two-day training camps at Boca Juniors and Botafogo.

Canberra Croatia FC

Joined Canberra Croatia in 2011 commencing his senior career at 16 years old. During his debut season, he made 10 Premier League appearances. In June of the 2011 season, Evans travelled to Croatia and trained with Dinamo Zagreb for two weeks before playing with Canberra Croatia in the Croatian Club World Cup where they finished as runners-up.

He went on to make 64 appearances for Canberra Croatia before signing with Tai Po during the 2014 season as a 19-year-old.

During his time at Canberra Croatia, Evans trained with A-League teams Central Coast Mariners and Adelaide United. He also spent a short period training with Sydney Olympic in the National Premier League NSW.

Tai Po FC

On transferring to Tai Po in September 2014 he made his debut a few days later against Kitchee. He went on to make 8 appearances for Tai Po in Premier League and Cup competitions.

Kamphaengphet F.C.

In January 2015 he transferred to Kamphaengphet in the Thailand AIS Regional League Division 2. He debuted for the club at the start of the 2015 season in February where he established himself as a first team player. Evans an instrumental role in getting Kamphaengphet into the round of 16 in the Thai FA Cup.

The 2016 season saw Kamphaengphet finish 2nd in the Northern Regional League Competition making the Champions League finals for the first time in club history, reaching the final 8 teams just missing promotion to Division 1. Kamphaeng Phet will now play in the new Northern Championship League in 2017.

He was recognised widely as a major contributor to the success of the team. Solid performances defensively and his trademark long throw-in, ensured he was a player teams analysed. By the end of the 2016 season he had made 64 appearances and scored 4 goals.

Lanexang United FC

At the completion of an outstanding 2016 season he signed with Lanexang United the 2016 Laos Premier League Champions who will compete in the 2016 Toyota Mekong Club Championship and the 2017 AFC Cup Group Stage. He debuted for Lanexang United on 5 November 2016 in Vientiane in the opening Toyota Mekong Club Championship game vs SHB Da Nang coming on as a sub in the second half. Lanexang United won the game 2–1. On 27 December 2016 he made his starting debut vs Yadanarbon at the Mandalar Thiri Stadium in Myanmar. Lanexang United drew the game 3 -3 and progressed to the semi finals of the Mekong Club Championships where they met Boeung Ket Angkor in Phnom Penh, Cambodia. Lanexang won the semi final 3-0 and play Buriram United in the two legged final on 4 January 2017 and 8 January 2017. In the first leg of the final Lanexang United won 1 - 0.

After good performances during the Toyota Mekong Cup, he was selected to play in the Laos Premier League All - Stars squad. The squad played Thailand Premier League giants Muangthong United in a game in Vientiane.

PS Barito Putera

After the demise of Lanexang United he signed with Barito Putera for the 2017 President's Cup and 2017 Liga 1 competitions. Debuting on 7 February 2017 in a Presidents Cup game vs Borneo Samarinda. where the game ended 0-0, his Liga 1 debut came on 15 April 2017 in the season opening game versus Mitra Kukar in a home match at May 17th Stadium. Barito won the game 2–1. After a good start to the league he scored his first goal in the third game when Barito played Perseru Serui. He went on to play every minute of all 17 games played in Leg 1.
At the completion of the 2017 Liga 1 season, Evans had played 31 games as a centre-back or defensive midfielder.

His performances throughout the 2017 season saw him offered a contract extension for the 2018 Liga 1 season.

PSM Makassar

Evans' signed with PSM Makassar for the Indonesian Liga 1 2019 season. He debuted on 26 January 2019 in a 2018–19 Piala Indonesia game vs Kalteng Putra with PSM winning 2–1. He played in his debut AFC Cup match vs Home United at Jalan Besar Stadium in Singapore on 27 February 2019. His Liga 1 debut game vs Semen Padang was in the first round on 20 May 2019. PSM won 1-0 and Evans played 90 mins.

He scored his first goal for PSM playing in the second leg of the 2019 AFC Cup ASEAN Semi final vs Becamex Binh Duong, with PSM winning the game 2–1. PSM made the final of the 2018–19 Piala Indonesia. The two legged final resulted in Persija Jakarta winning the first leg 1–0 at home. The second leg in Makassar saw PSM win 2-0 with Evans scoring the first goal and then providing an assist for the second. As a result, PSM became Piala Indonesia Champions and earned the right to play in AFC Cup 2020. The Piala Indonesia Final Leg 1 played at Gelora Bung Karno Stadium in Jakarta was played in front of 70,306 fans, making it the 15th highest attendance at a football game in the world in 2019.

PSS Sleman

He joined PSS Sleman in January for the 2020 Liga 1 season. His debut for PS Sleman came in Round 1 of Liga 1 vs PSM Makassar at Andi Mattalata Stadium in Maksassar on 1 March 2020. PSM won the game 2–1. He scored his first goal for PSS vs Persib Bandung in Round 3 in Bandung.

After the suspension of Liga 1 2020 due to COVID-19, he re-signed for the 2021 Liga 1 season. His first appearance for the season was in the second game of the pre season 2021 Menpora Cup vs Persela.

NorthEast United FC

On September 24th 2022, he signed for ISL side NorthEast United.

On 8 October 2022 he made his Indian Super League debut coming on as a late substitute in their controversial 1-0 away defeat to Bengaluru.

Career statistics

Club

Honours

PSM Makassar
 Piala Indonesia: 2019

PSS Sleman
 Menpora Cup third place: 2021

References

External links 
 
 Aaron Evans Interview

1994 births
Living people
Sportspeople from Canberra
Soccer players from the Australian Capital Territory
Australian people of Welsh descent
Croatian people of Australian descent
People with acquired Croatian citizenship
Association football midfielders
Croatian footballers
Australian soccer players
Tai Po FC players
Kamphaeng Phet F.C.
Lanexang United F.C. players
PS Barito Putera players
PSM Makassar players
PSS Sleman players
Persis Solo players
NorthEast United FC players
National Premier Leagues players
Hong Kong First Division League players
Aaron Evans
Liga 1 (Indonesia) players
Indian Super League players
Australian expatriate soccer players
Expatriate footballers in Hong Kong
Australian expatriate sportspeople in Hong Kong
Expatriate footballers in Thailand
Australian expatriate sportspeople in Thailand
Expatriate footballers in Laos
Expatriate footballers in Indonesia
Australian expatriate sportspeople in Indonesia
Expatriate footballers in India
Australian expatriate sportspeople in India